Jabez Hewitt Wells (October 10, 1853 – January 24, 1930) was an American curler, hotel owner, and politician.

Born in the town of Fort Winnebago, Columbia County, Wisconsin, Wells was educated in the Columbia County public schools. He was the owner of the Emder Hotel in Portage, Wisconsin. Wells was also president of the Portage Curling Club and a member of the Crusader Rink in Portage, Wisconsin which won the international curling trophy in Manitoba, Canada. In 1882, Wells was the Portage City Clerk. From 1885 to 1887. Wells was Portage County Circuit Court clerk. Wells was a Democrat. However, Wells switched to the Republican Party when he was nominated for the county circuit court office. In 1899, Wells served in the Wisconsin State Assembly. Wells died at his home in Portage, Wisconsin of pneumonia.

References

External links

1853 births
1930 deaths
People from Portage, Wisconsin
American male curlers
Businesspeople from Wisconsin
Sportspeople from Wisconsin
Wisconsin Democrats
County officials in Wisconsin
Republican Party members of the Wisconsin State Assembly